Mass No. 6 in E-flat major,  950, is a mass composed by Franz Schubert, a few months before his death.

Background
The first date to appear on the score is June 1828, although evidence exists that Schubert had begun to sketch it earlier than this. It was completed by July. It was composed in response to a commission or request from Michael Leitermayer, choirmaster of the Church of the Holy Trinity (Alserkirche) in Alsergrund, Vienna. The mass was not performed until after Schubert's death, with a premiere in the Alserkirche on October 4, 1829. Ferdinand Schubert conducted the premiere, as well as a second performance in the Church of Maria Trost on November 15, 1829.

The influence of Beethoven is felt in the mass, particularly in the "ambitious Beethovenian architecture". Schubert had been a torchbearer at Beethoven's funeral, which had been held in the Alserkirche. References to Bach's fugues are present in the Gloria and Agnus Dei, as well as Mozart's Requiem and Haydn's Heiligmesse.

This setting and the earlier Mass in A-flat major are regarded as Schubert's "late masses". These are distinguished from his four early masses by their "musically interpretive stance to the words"; Schubert began to take advantage of an overall maturation in his technical capabilities and knowledge of harmony, coupled with his experience in composing both sacred and secular music, to add further meaning to the standard text. Already known for consistently omitting certain passages from the text, Schubert took even greater freedoms in the late masses, adding and removing text in a bid to "deepen expression or enhance a particular aspect of meaning".

The Schubert scholar Brian Newbould opined that the late masses were the composer's "two finest and most substantial settings", calling the Mass in E-flat "the triumph and swansong of [Schubert's] career (as far as the composition of masses is concerned)", although he also admits that it has "unevenness". Schubert's biographer Kreissle von Hellborn wrote that the Mass in E-flat "takes rank with the foremost compositions of the kind written at the time".

The late masses may have influenced the composition of Bruckner's Mass in F minor.

 published the first edition of the piano score in 1865, anonymously edited by Johannes Brahms.

Structure
The mass consists of six movements. Performances require approximately an hour.

 In a display of "unusual and thoroughly proto-Romantic modulation", the Sanctus opens in E-flat major, moves to B minor, then to G minor, and finally to E-flat minor, all in the space of 8 bars.

Notes

Sources

Further reading

External links

Masses by Franz Schubert
1828 compositions
Compositions in E-flat major